The Cemitério dos Ingleses is a cemetery in Recife, the capital of Pernambuco in Brazil. It was built in 1814, and at the time was named British Cemetery.

History
By order of  the Prince Regent of Portugal, the president of the province of Pernambuco donated a plot of land to the English Consul in Recife, upon which was built a cemetery.

Location
The cemetery is located in the neighborhood of Santo Amaro in Avenida Cruz Cabugá, between Recife and Olinda.

The cemetery appears to be permanently closed, though this is not the case. It is closed to casual visitors, as there are fewer burials there at this time. People who wish to enter the cemetery must schedule their visit, so that the cemetery can be opened.

Sepultura major
Although originally this was intended to be a cemetery for the burial of British residents in Recife, people of other nationalities are buried here, and even some Brazilians.

There was extensive trade with Great Britain at the time, and many British people died in Brazil due to yellow fever. The cemetery was established because the majority of cemeteries in Brazil in the early 19th century were Roman Catholic and so did not allow interment of non-Catholics. Few British were Roman Catholic at the time. The cemetery was thereby established for the sake of the British who died there.

The most important Brazilian buried there is General José Inácio de Abreu e Lima, who fought for the liberation of Spanish-held lands in the Americas, from Chile up through what is now the United States.

For similar reasons, some non-Catholic Brazilians, largely Protestant, were buried there, due to the Catholic Church's reluctance to permit their burial in land consecrated to that religion.

Maintenance
The cemetery is maintained by donations from members of the extant English community in Recife. It receives no financial help from the Brazilian government or the British crown.

References

External links
 Cemitério Dos Ingleses – Google+
 Commonwealth War Graves Santo Amaro British Cemetery – TracesofWar.com

1814 establishments in South America
Buildings and structures in Recife
Cemeteries established in the 1810s
Cemeteries in Recife